Hu Mingyuan (born May 17, 1996 in Qiqihar, Heilongjiang) is a female Chinese volleyball player. She is a middle blocker of the China women's national volleyball team. 
She participated at the 2019 Montreux Volley Masters,

On the club level, she plays for Liaoning Sansheng.

References

1996 births
Living people
Volleyball players from Heilongjiang
Chinese women's volleyball players
Middle blockers
Asian Games gold medalists for China
Asian Games medalists in volleyball
Medalists at the 2018 Asian Games
Volleyball players at the 2018 Asian Games
21st-century Chinese women